Xawery Tadeusz Stańczyk is a Polish poet, sociologist and essayist.

Life
Xawery Stańczyk was born in 1985 in Poland.
His debut poem book "Skarb piratów"(Pirate Treasure) was nominated to Nike Award
The reviews of his work have been published in Newsweek, Dwutygodnik and Art Papier amongst others.
His main fields of interest are popular music, social movements, youth culture, and public spaces in socialist and post-socialist Eastern Europe.

Education

Xawery Stańczyk graduated with M.A cultural studies (2009) as well as a Ph.D. (2015) from the Institute of Polish Culture, University of Warsaw, and an M.A. in sociology (2012) from the Institute of Applied Social Sciences, University of Warsaw.
Currently Xawery Stańczyk works as researcher at Institute of Philosophy and Sociology of the Polish Academy of Sciences
In 2016 his doctoral thesis "Macie swoją kulturę: Kultura alternatywna w Polsce 1978–1996"(2018) (You Have Your Own Culture: Alternative Culture in Poland 1978–1996) was recognized by The National Centre for Culture Poland as the best Ph.D. in cultural studies in Poland.

Bibliography

 "Macie swoją kulturę: Kultura alternatywna w Polsce 1978–1996" Narodowe Centrum Kultury, Warsaw, 2016
 "Handluj tym", Lampa i Iskra Boża, Warsaw, 2015
 "Skarb piratów", Lampa i Iskra Boża, Warsaw, 2014

References

External links
 Biography of Xawery Stańczyk at Pismo Widok (The View), Theories and Practices of Visual Culture, 2021 
 Poetry can be dirty and screamingAn interview with Xawery Stańczyk, Justyna Czechowska, Visegard Insight, 2014 
 Xawery Stańczyk at Google Scholar

Living people
1985 births
21st-century Polish poets
20th-century Polish writers
21st-century Polish male writers
21st-century Polish writers
Artist authors
Polish sociologists
20th-century essayists
21st-century essayists